Mazar-e Bi Abeh (also Romanized as Mazār-e Bī Ābeh; also known as Mazār-e Bī Āb and Mazār-e Bī Ābī) is a village in Qalandarabad Rural District, Qalandarabad District, Fariman County, Razavi Khorasan Province, Iran. At the 2006 census, its population was 117, in 26 families.

References 

Populated places in Fariman County